Ocean City may refer to one of several places in the United States:
Ocean City, Maryland, a prominent beach resort town in the mid-Atlantic region
Ocean City, New Jersey, a family-oriented seaside resort town near Atlantic City
Ocean City, North Carolina, a historically African-American district of North Topsail Beach, North Carolina
Ocean City, Florida, a census-designated place (CDP) in Okaloosa County
Ocean City, Washington, a sparsely populated CDP along the Pacific Coast

See also
West Ocean City, a small CDP in Worcester County, Maryland.